Lori Harrigan-Mack (born September 5, 1970) is an American, former collegiate All-American, right-handed hitting, left-handed softball pitcher originally from Anaheim, California. She was a three-time Olympic Champion as a member of the Team USA winning in 1996, 2000 and 2004. Harrigan played collegiately from 1989–1992 at the University of Nevada, Las Vegas where she owns numerous records; she is the Big West Conference career leader in shutouts and innings pitched and is a USA Softball Hall of Fame honoree.

Career

University of Nevada, Las Vegas
Harrigan kicked off her career being named a 1989 Second Team All-Big West honoree. She broke school season records in ERA, strikeouts and shutouts, all remain top-10 all-time. For her sophomore year, she earned identical conference accolades and broke her own ERA record while also setting new marks in wins (1990 NCAA top-10) and shutouts, both career highs, the latter of which remains the best for a Rebel season. Along with the second most innings pitched record (top-10 in the conference all-time), Harrigan also twirled her first no-hitter vs. the Utah Utes on March 16, 1990. The Rebels would make the 1990 Women's College World Series and Harrigan would toss all three games, including a win over the Kent State Golden Flashes before being eliminated by the FSU Seminoles on May 26.

As a junior, Harrigan earned a NFCA Third Team All-American citation to go along with a First Team All-Big West award. She would better her own ERA record and post a school and career best in strikeouts. Her wins (1991 NCAA top-10), shutouts and innings pitched are top-5 for a school season, the innings remains a conference top-10 mark. Harrigan would also toss two no-hitters that year. Her second and last appearance at the WCWS included a 13-inning loss to eventual champs the Arizona Wildcats on May 23.

For a final time Harrigan was named First Team for the conference and Third Team All-American. With career best strikeout ratio (5.7) as well as school season record WHIP, ERA and top-10 shutouts and strikeouts school marks, she also pitched three no-hitters and a perfect game. The lone school perfect performance on March 24, 1992 vs. the Missouri Tigers was an 8-inning win for Harrigan. Her ERA was ranked 10th for that NCAA year. For one of her no-hitters on February 14, she would set the school single game strikeouts record, fanning 15 of the Southern Utah Thunderbirds in regulation.

The Rebel would end her career leading in wins, ERA, strikeouts, shutouts and innings pitched and continues to hold the crown for all. Harrigan is tops in the Big West for shutouts and innings pitched and top-5 in wins, strikeouts and ERA all-time.

On February 26, 1998, Harrigan's jersey number was ceremonially retired. She was later inducted into the UNLV Rebels Hall of Fame.

Post-softball
Harrigan is the director of security at the Mandarin Oriental, Las Vegas.

The Biggest Loser: Glory Days

Harrigan was a contestant on the 16th season of the reality competition The Biggest Loser, titled The Biggest Loser: Glory Days, which premiered on September 11, 2014, on NBC. She began the show weighing 301 pounds and was 210 pounds on the day of the finale, for a total weight loss of 91 pounds.

Personal life
Harrigan is married to Andrew Mack and has a son, Shawn.

Career statistics

UNLV Rebels

Team USA Olympic Games

References

External links
 Lori Harrigan-Mack, The Biggest Loser Season 16
https://www.youtube.com/watch?v=yko8zIUPYlc

1970 births
Living people
Softball players from California
Olympic gold medalists for the United States in softball
Sportspeople from Anaheim, California
UNLV Rebels softball players
Olympic softball players of the United States
Medalists at the 2004 Summer Olympics
Medalists at the 2000 Summer Olympics
Medalists at the 1996 Summer Olympics
Softball players at the 1996 Summer Olympics
Softball players at the 2000 Summer Olympics
Softball players at the 2004 Summer Olympics